Minikino Film Week, Bali International Short Film Festival (MFW) is an annual International short film festival in Bali, Indonesia. MFW was initiated in 2015, organized by the Minikino committee as its parent organization, which has been working in this field since 2002. The organization and MFW is under Indonesian legal entity; Yayasan Kino Media.

History 
Since 2002 the organization has routinely held the Minikino Monthly Screening & Discussion (MMSD) events. The monthly event takes turns presenting each of the S-Express network programs that are submitted by a collaborative network of short film programmers from various countries in Southeast Asia. 

By presenting one after another S-Express programs and also adding other national and international short film programs, the monthly screening agenda for the whole year is fulfilled. Minikino programmer also present guest program at other international film festival such as The 7th annual Toronto Reel Asian International Film Festival in 2003.

The establishment of an annual short film festival has actually been discussed internally since 2004, but has been postponed several times.

2015

In early 2015, Minikino initiated a short film exchange program focusing on the national short film productions, the Indonesia Raja. These activities adopted what was implemented by S-Express. With the advent of this additional agenda, all available programs become too many to be held monthly within a year.

Minikino Film Week 2015 (MFW2015) then initiated, basically to deal with this situation. The first festival was held from 12 until 17 October 2015 to accommodate the increasing number of programs that once were meant to be in the monthly programs. The festival presents film selections from its film database and specifically invites short films from directors, distributors, and other film organizations. And also presents the annual short film program exchange; S-Express 2015 and the first year of Indonesia Raja. There were no open submissions.

2016

The 2nd Minikino Film Week (2ndMFW) was held the following year, from 8 until 15 October 2016. This is the first year the festival accepts open submission through MFW account in FilmFreeway platforms. Officially selected international films were presented in international programs, highlighting a particular theme, specific issues, genre, country or region of the world. 2nd MFW also presents several talks, workshops and networking events. And also a short film library for educators, professionals, distributors and festival programmers. Opening a limited access for professionals to preview Minikino's database of  short films that has been submitted throughout the year.

2017

In 2017, the 3rdMFW initiated their annual national competition Begadang Filmmaking Competition. At the same time, 3rdMFW also presents a board of jury that judges and decides on several categories for international awards.

The opening ceremony of the festival, 7 October 2017 was attended by Ricky Joseph Pesik, the Deputy Head of The Creative Economy Agency (BEKRAF RI, then later merged into The Ministry of Tourism and Creative Economy in 2020).

In 24 September 2017, less than 2 weeks before the opening date, security conditions was in high alert due to the eruption of Bali's volcano of mount Agung. 3 locations (out of total 6 locations) of POP-UP Cinemas had to re-planned and moved to the evacuation camps.

The date, schedule and program content have not changed, except 1 cancellation of the last program "S-Express 2017 Indonesia" on October 13, 2017 for considering the young audience convenience at the evacuation camp. This program was supposedly screened at the Youth & Sports Education Building, Bangli.

2018

In early 2018, Minikino Film Week was among several Indonesian delegations brought by The Creative Economy Agency of Indonesia to the South by SouthWest (SXSW) 2018 Trade Show in Austin, Texas. During the trade show, Minikino managed to make contact with the Austin Film Festival. This network then brought several Indonesia's short films to be shown in their 2018 edition. In exchange, a guest program from Austin Film Festival then screened at MFW4 in Bali, Indonesia, during 6-13 October 2018.

In collaboration with RDR-Rotary Disaster Relief, Bali School Kids and Rotary Club Bali Denpasar, MFW4 held a post-festival roadshow to Lombok island from 2 until 4 November 2018. The roadshow held 2 screening events in 2 of the Lombok earthquake evacuation camps, the disaster that had recently happened.

2019

Minikino Film Week 5, with the travel support from BEKRAF RI, was able to invite Roger Gonin, one of the important figures of Clermont-Ferrand International Short Film Festival and also Jukka-Pekka Laakso, the director of Tampere Film Festival. Some important names in the Indonesia film industry were also invited and took part in panel discussions and presentations in the MFW Short Film Market.

This is the first time the term Short Film Market is used in Minikino Film Week, emphasizing the festival's sub-events to hold presentation panels, talks and short film libraries, all the activities that aimed at strengthening Indonesia's short film ecosystem and connecting it to the international networks.

This time with support from Purin Pictures, Minikino Film Week is repeating its trip to Lombok in a post-festival roadshow. The road trip starts from October 31, 2019 to November 5, 2019, visiting 3 evacuation camps that have not yet fully recovered since last year.

In the same year, Minikino Film Week became a member of The Short Film Conference the organization for the global short film community.

2020

In early 2020, several plans and preparations for MFW6 had to be put on hold due to the pandemic situation in Indonesia. Yet the in-person festival still managed to go according to plan, 4-12 September 2020. This was the first year for MFW accepting submissions through Short Film Depot. The festival's dates also moved earlier to September instead of October.

Responding to the global crisis situation to reduce the risk of COVID-19, Minikino Film Week 6 had to integrate several online activities, especially for seminars, conferences, workshops and discussions. In addition, in-person participants are also restricted to meet safe physical distances between spectators, and practice all recommended health protocols by the authorities. The number of audiences were limited by the process of online booking and implementing strict health protocols.

2021

Minikino Film Week 7 was held for 9 days from 3 to 11 September 2021, involving 12 Micro Cinema venues around the island of Bali. Responding to the continuation of the global crisis, the festival applied strict protocols to access. At least 1st shot of COVID-19 vaccine or a medical test (swab) with negative result is mandatory to get the Festival Pass. All screenings and activities are still free of charge, yet limited only for the pass holder. The digital or printed document from the audience should always be ready to be shown on the venues before entering the premises.

The festival presents 2 inclusive programs equipped with Bahasa Indonesia Audio Description and Closed Caption, giving access for the Blind and Deaf audience.

Although most of the festival events that had been planned were still able to be implemented, some major adjustments experienced due to the rise of Cov-19 Delta Variant crisis situation in Bali. 1 out of 3 Pop-Up Cinema had to be cancelled, due to the sudden increasing number and high Cov-19 cases in Buleleng area. The location of the opening event which was originally planned to be held in Sanur had to be moved to Geo Open Space in Kerobokan, due to the local lock down policy. 1 program at the open air cinema at Alliance Française Bali also had to be cancelled due to the rain.

Minikino Film Week 7 Post-Festival was decided not to be held this year, due to the uncertainty and ongoing pandemic emergency situation.

Events

MINIKINO FILM WEEK 2015
Held in Bali, Indonesia, 12 to 17 October 2015, presents 88 short films and 6 feature films and attracted 1656 audiences.

Program

Indonesia Raja 2015 (Indonesia Short Film Program Exchange). 
S-EXPRESS 2015 (Southeast Asia Short Film Program Exchange).
Featuring Director: Tonny Trimarsanto
First Time Public Screening BULU MATA (EYE LASHES)
Renita Renita & Mangga Golek Matang di Pohon
Featuring Project Change
Cerita Tentang Rahasia (Directed by Monica Vanesa Tedja, Yatna Pelangi, Mayk Wongkar, Anggun Pradesha Dan Rikky M. Fajar..)
Featuring KOLEKTIF
Vakansi Yang Janggal dan Penyakit Lainnya (Dir: Yosep Anggi Noen)
SITI (Dir: Eddie Cahyono / 2015)
 The Sun, The Moon & The Hurricane (Dir: Andry Cung)
 3 Film Pendek Tentang SARA(S) (Dir: Kamila Andini, Yosep Anggi Noen, Lucky Kuswandi)
Special program
Keluarkan Isi Hatiku (Get My Feelings Out) (Dir: Paul Agusta)
Regional Feature: LELAKI HARAPAN DUNIA (Men Who Save the World) (Dir: Liew Seng Tat /  Malaysia / 2014)
CLOSING EVENT: MINIKINO SHORTS AUCTION

2nd MINIKINO FILM WEEK (2016)
Held in Bali, Indonesia, 8 to15 October 2016.
11 Venues, 250+ Short Film, 4 Fringe Event.

Program

Indonesia Raja 2016, the annual short film exchange between cities in Indonesia
S-EXPRESS 2016, the annual short film exchange of South East Asia countries
International Short Films selected from the open submission (68 Country, 158 Short Films selected out of 6557 entries)
Special Program
Ombak Bali Film Festival 
ReelOzInd! Film Festival Australia
Fringe Events
Journalistic Workshop with Sloka Institute.
Photography Workshop with Bali Photo Forum
Music Video Behind The Scene Discussion with Pygmy Marmoset.

3rd MINIKINO FILM WEEK (2017) 

Held in Bali, Indonesia, 7 to 14 Oktober 2017. The festival presents 225 International Short Films, including Indonesia in 20 venues, in total of 138 events.

Screening programs 
 National programs: Indonesia Raja 2017
 South East-Asia selection; The S-Express 2017
 The International Selection
 Invited programs from other festival & organizational collaborators
 ReelOzind! 2017 programs
 Made in Malaysia: Liew Seng Tat's short films
 Made in Indonesia: Sidi Saleh
 Image Forum Festival: A Peek to Japan Tomorrow

Workshops and Presentations 

 Acting Workshop with Paul Agusta
 Digital Cinematography Workshop with Benny Kadarhariarto

Begadang Filmmaking Competition in Minikino Film Week 
This year was the 1st annual competition of Begadang Filmmaking Competition. The participants will get a list of audio-visual elements that has to be part of the film. Then they are required to produce a short film using these elements and the final film must have been submitted within 34 hours.

For 34 hours, the participants carried out the entire production process; from the story development until the final film submitted.

Grand Prize Winner of Begadang Filmmaking Competition 2017: ALMARI by Husyin & team Guru, from Banjarmasin, Kalimantan Selatan

International Competition in the 3rd Minikino Film Week 
This year also the 1st time for the annual International Awarding. 3rd Minikino Film Week Award is an International award in the form of a non-monetary reward. Awards were announced and given on the awarding night, on October 14, 2017 at the closing ceremony of festival.

The 2017 Post Festival Event 
Held as a roadshow to Jakarta, for another screenings and presentation in 3 venues. It was held in 25-26 October 2017.

MINIKINO FILM WEEK 4 (2018) 

Held in Bali, Indonesia, 6 - 13 October 2018

MINIKINO FILM WEEK 5 (2019) 

Held in Bali, Indonesia, 5 - 12 October 2019

MINIKINO FILM WEEK 6 (2020) 

Held in Bali, Indonesia, 4 - 12 September 2020

MINIKINO FILM WEEK 7 (2021) 

Held in Bali, Indonesia, 3 - 11 September 2021

MINIKINO FILM WEEK 8 (2022) 

Held in Bali, Indonesia for 9 days, from September 2, 2022, the opening event, until September 10, 2022. This series of events concludes on the last day with the screenings of all the winning short films announced on 9 September 2022.

POST FESTIVAL ROADSHOW 2022

From 22 October 2022 to 11 November 2022, Minikino Film Week then held a Post Festival Roadshow 2022, bringing this year's winning short films to 8 cities in Indonesia. The events held were in the form of short film screenings and several presentations focused on various elements in short film festival management.

In all of these activities, Minikino visits and collaborates with local film communities as well as universities, film festival organizations such as the Aceh Film Festival (Aceh), the Flobamora Film Festival in Kupang, Cinema Cirebon (Cirebon, West Java), UMN (Tangerang), Sinekoci (Palu, Central Sulawesi) and the ISI Padang Panjang student group.

References

External links
 MFW Official Website 
Minikino Film Week at FilmFreeway.com
Minikino Film Week at Short Film Depot
Minikino official website (in Bahasa Indonesia & English)
The Short Film Conference 

Short film festivals
Film festivals in Indonesia